Summer Sons is a 2021 Southern Gothic novel by Lee Mandelo.

Synopsis 
The book's protagonist, Andrew, investigates the suicide of his friend Eddie just six months after Eddie left to begin a master's degree.

Themes 
The book has been described as fitting into the Southern Gothic genre, as well as the dark academia aesthetic. Jake Casella Brookins of the Chicago Review of Books noted that Andrew demonstrates hyper-awareness of bodies and car culture, and that the book deals with issues such as homophobia, rural poverty, and exploitation in academia.

Publishing history 
The cover was designed and created by Christine Foltzer and Sasha Vinogradova, and was revealed in January 2021. The book was then published on September 28, 2021.

Reception 
The book received generally good reviews, with commentators noting the atmosphere and queer themes in particular, but received some criticism for its pacing. Sarah Campsall of The Nerd Daily described it as "a haunting, slow burn of a novel that explores grief, loss, denial, and a hunt for truth set against an atmospheric backdrop of the humid heat of the south," comparing it to Maggie Stiefvater's The Raven Cycle. Publishers Weekly described the book as "like Tennessee molasses—dense, dark, slow-moving, and with a distinct Southern flavor," stating that the book shines most in its love triangle. Sadie Hartmann of Cemetery Dance found that "it’s powerful that Mandelo crushes queer stereotypes," but that "heading into the middle of the book, the story gets bogged down some." Writing for Jezebel, Alix E. Harrow compared it to the Fast & Furious franchise, describing it as "hot, haunted boys with fast cars making bad choices."

References 

2021 American novels
Southern Gothic novels
Novels set in the United States
2020s LGBT novels
Tor Books books